Barbatia candida, or the White-bearded ark clam, is a clam in the family Arcidae. It can be found along the Atlantic coast of North America, ranging from North Carolina to Texas, including the West Indies.

References

candida
Molluscs described in 1771